This article lists the reported and registered HIV/AIDS cases by reporting region.  A region may refer to a country or subdivision, national HIV records are often complicated incomplete or even nonexistent.   This list is only documented cases, not for estimated cases.   Estimated case numbers differ in significant ways: estimates are available for all areas for all years unlike hard records, and estimates attempt to quantify an epidemic in current time, whereas registered/documented cases are behind the curve, they have lag time to detection and represent the past rather than current situation.

Documentation of HIV transmission often present with significant holes and inconsistencies.  In the earlier years of the epidemic, especially in Africa, health systems where completely overwhelmed and millions of people died without government recordkeeping, there is little way of knowing how many people contracted HIV, to get around the problem to get the total cumulative number of HIV infections, HIV death data is taken into account in the table below where those living with HIV are summed with those died of HIV for a cumulative HIV infection figure, nevertheless, the data of credible death estimates exist only for the specific years where available.  In spite of data quality issues, all these types of data help to create an epidemiological picture.

US CDC has changed reporting standards for AIDS related deaths (again in 2014); HIV case reporting is not uniform among states that also implement their own surveillance.   Globally, some 35.3 million are living with HIV/AIDS, World Health Organization (WHO), an estimated 36 million people have died since the first cases were reported in 1981 and 1.6 million people died of HIV/AIDS in 2012. Using WHO statistics, in 2012 the number of people living with HIV was growing at a faster rate (1.98%) than worldwide human population growth (1.1% annual), and the cumulative number of people with HIV is growing at roughly three times faster (3.22%).   The costs of treatment is significantly increasing burden on healthcare systems when budgets remain stagnant, causing cutoffs in funding to healthcare providers.

List
Color code: Countries/regions in light blue have latest year HIV cases exceeding 10% of cumulative total, deep blue exceeding 20%, and pink exceeding 30%.  These colors suggest an outbreak or insufficient reporting.  If HIV estimates are correct, government efforts to report are still hugely inadequate, only 1 in 3 HIV cases have ever been reported globally, and 1 in 7 deaths (using this list as reference). Note: Deaths in US jurisdictions include all causes.  Documented deaths may be estimated, please consult individual references sources.
Word of caution on data below: Higher numbers on this list often reflect better reporting and data, it does not necessarily indicate (nor imply) a larger epidemic.  Reporting of HIV cases and deaths are quite often delayed by years, data here can mask HIV epidemics.

Over 100,000 cases

Over 10,000 cases

Under 10,000 cases

 (1) Note: HIV cases sums use national data, subdivision data summed for deaths when national data not available.
 (2) "Figures as of" refers to for when the data is valid, not when the data is released.
 (3) ? in 'Updated every' column denotes intervals with missing data, update irregularities
 (4) French cumulative figures only from 2004.
 (5) Brazil only began counting HIV cases from 2000, but AIDS from 1980.
 (6) Volta region of Ghana cumulative cases beginning in 2008.
 (7) China previously released older figures that were higher, and revised its numbers down with no explanation given.

References

HIV AIDS cases and deaths registered by region
HIV/AIDS